Roger Bede Nott  (20 October 1908 – 28 September 2000) was an Australian politician and a member of the New South Wales Legislative Assembly from  1941 until 1961. He was a member of the Labor Party and held numerous ministerial positions between 1954 and 1961. He was the Administrator of the Northern Territory between 1961 and 1964.

Early life
Nott was born at Gulgong, New South Wales and was the son of a farmer. Leo Nott, Gulgong Shire President and member of the Legislative Assembly for Mudgee and Burrendong, was his brother. He was educated to elementary level at Gulgong Public School and initially worked as a shearer and farm hand. He later became a wheat farmer at Dunedoo.

Political career
Nott was elected to the parliament as the Labor member for Liverpool Plains at the 1941 state election. He replaced the Country Party member Harry Carter and defeated the Country Party candidate Alfred Yeo who had been the member for Castlereagh. Liverpool Plains was one of a number of rural seats that Labor won at the 1941 election and these victories contributed to the formation of the Labor government of William McKell.

Nott was a member of the governments of Joseph Cahill and Robert Heffron. He was appointed as a Minister without portfolio in 1954 and between 1956 and 1957 was the Secretary for Lands and Secretary for Mines. From 1957 until his retirement he was the Minister for Agriculture.

Later life and career
Nott retained his seat in parliament at a further six elections, but resigned in 1961 to accept an appointment from the Federal government as the Administrator of the Northern Territory. It is uncertain why the Liberal/Country coalition government of Robert Menzies offered the position to a Labor minister. Accepting the position required Nott to resign from parliament, and the Country Party's Frank O'Keefe, who had been an unsuccessful candidate at four previous elections, won the resulting by-election.

He resigned as administrator of the Northern Territory to be appointed Administrator of Norfolk Island in July 1964.
Nott ran as the Labor candidate for the 1969 Gwydir by-election and the subsequent general election. He then ran for the 1970 Upper Hunter by-election caused by O'Keefe's transfer to the federal seat of Paterson, coming within 1.6% of winning the seat.

Granted retention of the title "The Honourable" in 1961, Nott was appointed a Commander of the Order of the British Empire (CBE) in 1977 for services to the state of New South Wales.

References

 

1908 births
2000 deaths
Members of the New South Wales Legislative Assembly
Administrators of Norfolk Island
Administrators of the Northern Territory
Australian Labor Party members of the Parliament of New South Wales
20th-century Australian politicians
Australian Commanders of the Order of the British Empire